"Survivor" is Tohoshinki's twenty-sixth Japanese single. The single was released on  11 March 2009 and peaked at number three on the Oricon Singles Chart. It is composed by Iain James, Robert Habolin, and Adam Powers and produced by Habolin.

Track list

Live performances
March 6, 2009 - Music Station
March 13, 2009 - Music Japan
March 14, 2009 - Music Fighter
April 25, 2009 - Music fair 21

Chart

External links
 Official Japanese website

TVXQ songs
Japanese-language songs
2009 singles
Songs written by Iain James
Songs written by Adam Powers
2009 songs
Rhythm Zone singles
Songs written by Robert Habolin